Kisszurdok is the Hungarian name for two villages in Romania:

 Surducel village, Vârciorog Commune, Bihor County
 Surducu Mic village, Traian Vuia Commune, Timiș County